Charmaine Marchand-Stiaes is an American politician. She served as a Democratic member of the Louisiana House of Representatives from 2004 to 2012. During her tenure, she highlighted the havoc wreaked by Hurricane Katrina on her constituents.

References

Living people
Democratic Party members of the Louisiana House of Representatives
Year of birth missing (living people)